Protocotyle  is a genus of monogeneans in the family Hexabothriidae. The genus was created by Louis Euzet and Claude Maillard in 1974.

Protocotyle includes only three species, which are all parasitic on the gills of sharks of the genus Hexanchus, namely Hexanchus griseus and Hexanchus nakamurai.
The species are:
 Protocotyle grisea (Cerfontaine, 1899) Euzet & Maillard, 1974 
 Protocotyle taschenbergi (Maillard & Oliver, 1966) Euzet & Maillard, 1974 
 Protocotyle euzetmaillardi Justine, 2011

References 

Polyopisthocotylea
Monogenea genera